Maria L. Svart is an American activist and National Director of Democratic Socialists of America, the largest socialist organization in the United States. She has been National Director since June 2011. She succeeded Frank Llewellyn, who had announced earlier that year that he was stepping down after ten years.

Early life and education 
Svart was born and raised in Portland, Oregon, where she attended Lincoln High School. She then attended the University of Chicago, where she became a member of the university's Young Democratic Socialists chapter. She served as the feminist issues coordinator on the YDS Coordinating Committee and later as co-chair. Her campus activism, through YDS and other student organizations, focused on feminist, environmental, immigrant rights, anti-war and labor solidarity work.

Career 
After college, Svart became a campus organizer with the Massachusetts Public Interest Research Group, while simultaneously helping successive YDS organizers and leaders begin to bridge the generational gap between YDS and DSA. Svart then worked for seven years with the Service Employees International Union and the Committee of Interns & Residents/SEIU Healthcare. At CIR, she organized resident physicians to speak out in support of Medicaid and funding for safety net hospitals.

She served as chair of the New York City DSA local and was elected to the National Political Committee at the 2009 DSA convention. On the NPC, Svart has chaired the Program Committee, which has provided materials and guidance that have helped DSA locals and YDS chapters participate in the fight against state and federal budget cuts and to defend the rights of public employees. Throughout involvement in DSA, Maria has stressed the importance of understanding how she deems; patriarchy, racism, and other structures of oppression intersect with capitalism; the need to train more activists in the skills necessary to intervene effectively in politics; and the "crucial role of both public and internal socialist education in the building of our movement".

Personal life 
Svart lives in Brooklyn, New York. Svart is biracial, and has Mexican ancestry.

References

External links 
 Constitution of the DSA. dsausa.org Retrieved February 25, 2010.
 Young Democratic Socialists official website — youth affiliate of the DSA.
 National Public Radio segment on the burgeoning interest in the DSA

Living people
University of Chicago alumni
Members of the Democratic Socialists of America
American feminists
Socialist feminists
American people of Mexican descent
American people of Danish descent
Year of birth missing (living people)
People from Portland, Oregon